Cycle one of Australia's Next Top Model began airing on 11 January 2005 on Fox8. The ten contestants from around the country chosen for the competition converged in Sydney, where they spent eight weeks sharing an inner city apartment while competing for the title of Australia's Next Top Model. The series finale was held in Melbourne.

The prizes for winning the first cycle of Australia's Next Top Model included a modelling contract with Chic Model Management, an all-expenses paid trip to Milan to meet with Italian modeling agency Fashion, an eight-page editorial in Cleo magazine, and a national campaign for Napoleon cosmetics.

The winner of the competition was 22-year-old Gemma Sanderson from Newcastle.

Cast

Contestants
(Ages stated are at start of contest)

Judges
Erika Heynatz
Alex Perry
Ken Thompson
Marguerite Kramer

Other cast members
Michael Azzolini – personal stylist

Episodes

Summaries

Call-out order

 The contestant was eliminated.
 The contestant quit the competition.
 The contestant was part of a non-elimination bottom two.
 The contestant won the competition.

Average call-out order
Final two is not included.

Bottom two

 The contestant was eliminated after her first time in the bottom two/three
 The contestant was eliminated after her second time in the bottom two/three
 The contestant quit the competition
 The contestant was eliminated in the final judging and placed as the runner-up

Notes

References

2005 Australian television seasons
Australia's Next Top Model seasons
Television shows filmed in Australia